Philip I of Boulogne (Philip Hurepel) (1200–1235) was a French prince, Count of Clermont-en-Beauvaisis in his own right, and Count of Boulogne, Mortain, Aumale, and Dammartin-en-Goële jure uxoris.

Philip was born in September 1200, the son of Philip II of France and his controversial third wife Agnes of Merania. Illegitimacy shadowed his birth and career, but he was legitimated by Pope Innocent III. He was associated with founding the Tour du Guet in Calais. He is the first recorded person to bear a differenced version of the arms of France.

Marriage
Philip was married in c. 1223 to Matilda II, Countess of Boulogne. Philip, by right of his wife, became Count of Boulogne, Mortain, Aumale, and Dammartin-en-Goële. He revolted against his sister-in-law Blanche of Castile when his elder half-brother Louis VIII died in 1226. When Philip died in 1235, Matilda continued to reign and was married to Afonso III of Portugal.

Matilda and Philip had:
Alberic of Boulogne
Joan of Boulogne married Gaucher de Châtillon in 1236.

Ancestry

References

Sources

1201 births
1235 deaths
13th-century French people
Philippe
Counts of Clermont-en-Beauvaisis
Illegitimate children of French monarchs
Jure uxoris officeholders
Counts of Boulogne
Counts of Mortain
Counts of Aumale
Philippe
Children of Philip II of France
Sons of kings